Ratnayake Wasala Mudiyanselage Abeyratne  Ratnayaka (7 January 1900 - 1977) was a Sri Lankan politician. He was the first Cabinet Minister of Food, Co-operatives; Minister of Home Affairs  in independent Ceylon (now Sri Lanka) and the last President of the Senate of Ceylon.

Education
He received his primary education at Dharmaraja College Kandy and secondary education at Royal College Colombo.

Political career
Ratnayaka was elected to the first State Council of Ceylon from Dumbara and reelected to the second State Council of Ceylon. As a member of the Executive Committee on Education, he suggested that education should be free from kindergarten to university, an idea he had received from a private member, which though supported by P. de S. Kularatne, S. Natesan and T. B. Jayah, was opposed by C. W. W. Kannangara. He was elected to the first parliament from the Wattegama in the 1947 general elections from the United National Party. Thereafter he was invited by D. S. Senanayake to join his cabinet as the Minister for Food and Cooperatives Undertakings. Following D. S. Senanayake's death he served in the same capacity until he was appointed Minister of Home Affairs in 1952, following the 1952 general elections when he was re-elected from Wattegama. He remained Minister of Home Affairs in the Kotelawala cabinet until he was defeated at the 1956 general elections by Aloysius Weerakoon from the Sri Lanka Freedom Party. Contesting the March 1960 general election, he was again defeated by Weerakoon, but won the subsequent July 1960 general election, with Weerakoon switching to the United National Party and contesting the seat of Kundasale. He sat in the opposition until the 1965 general election when he allowed Weerakoon to contest his seat as the United National Party candidate. Ratnayaka was appointed to the Senate of Ceylon in 1965 and was elected President of the Senate of Ceylon succeeding Thomas Amarasuriya and serving till the abolishment of the Senate in 1971.

Family
His daughter of Nalini Ratnayaka married Professor Punchi Bandara Sannasgala, an academic researcher on Sinhala language, Sinhala literature, Pali and Sanskrit. His granddaughter Professor Kshanika Hirimburegama, was the Vice Chancellor of the University of Colombo and the first lady Chairperson of the University Grant Commission.

References

Home affairs ministers of Sri Lanka
United National Party politicians
Presidents of the Senate of Ceylon
Alumni of Royal College, Colombo
Alumni of Dharmaraja College
Members of the 1st State Council of Ceylon
Members of the 2nd State Council of Ceylon
Members of the 1st Parliament of Ceylon
Members of the 2nd Parliament of Ceylon
Members of the 5th Parliament of Ceylon
1900 births
1977 deaths